Grace Helen Whitener (born 1964/1965) is a Trinidadian-American attorney and jurist serving as an associate justice of the Washington Supreme Court. Whitener was nominated by Governor Jay Inslee on April 13, 2020, to fill the seat of retiring justice Charles K. Wiggins.

Early life and education 
Whitener was born and raised in Trinidad. She moved to the United States when she was 16 to receive medical care. She earned a Bachelor of Business Administration degree in international marketing and trade from Baruch College, followed by a Juris Doctor from the Seattle University School of Law.

Career 
After graduating from law school, Whitener worked as a public defender, prosecutor, and private defense attorney.

She served as a judge on the Board of Industrial Insurance Appeals for two years and then on the Pierce County Superior Court from 2015 to 2020, having been appointed by Governor Inslee and elected unopposed in 2015 and 2016.

On April 13, 2020, she was appointed to the Washington Supreme Court by Governor Jay Inslee. She successfully ran for election in 2020 for the remaining two years of Wiggins's term, winning 66% of the vote.

Personal life 
She is the first African-American, LGBTQ judge in Washington and second African-American member of the Washington Supreme Court after Charles Z. Smith. She is disabled. Whitener is co-chair of the Washington State Minority and Justice Commission.

Whitner is married to Lynn Rainey, a fellow graduate of the Seattle University School of Law and an LGBTQ activist.

See also 
 List of African-American jurists
 List of LGBT jurists in the United States
 List of LGBT state supreme court justices in the United States
 List of first women lawyers and judges in Washington

References

External links 
Campaign biography

1960s births
Year of birth uncertain
Living people
21st-century American judges
21st-century American women judges
African-American judges
African-American lawyers
American women lawyers
Baruch College alumni
Justices of the Washington Supreme Court
LGBT African Americans
LGBT appointed officials in the United States
Trinidad and Tobago LGBT people
LGBT people from Washington (state)
Seattle University School of Law alumni
Superior court judges in the United States
Washington (state) lawyers
Washington (state) state court judges
21st-century African-American women
21st-century African-American people
LGBT judges
Public defenders
American prosecutors